Winsford is a civil parish in Cheshire West and Chester, England.  It contains 26 buildings that are recorded in the National Heritage List for England as designated listed buildings.  The largest town in the parish is Winsford, which absorbed the communities of Over and Wharton as it grew.  Historically it is in a salt-producing area, although this is not directly reflected in any of the listing buildings.  The Middlewich Branch of the Shropshire Union Canal passes through the parish, and one of its bridges is listed.  The area around the town is mainly rural.  Most of the listed buildings are houses, or related to farming.  Also included in the list are some municipal buildings, four memorials, and three churches and structures associated with them.  Part of the parish was formerly owned by the estate of Vale Royal Abbey, and two of their properties, since adapted for other purposes, are listed.

Key

Buildings

References

Citations

Sources

Listed buildings in Cheshire West and Chester
Lists of listed buildings in Cheshire
Listed